Timothy Robert Ward (born February 28, 1987, in Waukesha, Wisconsin) is an American former professional soccer player.

Career

Youth and college
Ward, who can play any position on defense and also in defensive midfield, trained with the United States Under-17 team at the Bradenton Academy from 2002 to 2004.  Following his graduation, he played a year of college soccer at Saint Louis University, starting 18 games for the Billikens, and being named second-team All-Conference USA.

Professional
Ward left after his freshman season to sign a Generation adidas contract with MLS, whereupon he was selected 12th overall in the 2005 MLS SuperDraft by the MetroStars, who acquired the pick by trading Cornell Glen to FC Dallas. Ward acquitted himself well in his rookie season, especially with his runs and crosses from the left back spot. After the year, he was traded to Columbus Crew for Chris Henderson.

After two seasons in Columbus, Ward was traded to Colorado Rapids on February 27, 2008, for Nicolas Hernández. However, he was waived at the end of the 2008 season without playing a first-team game. He was on trial with Chicago Fire for most of early 2009, eventually signing with the team in March. In 2009 Ward started all 19 games he appeared in for Chicago before breaking a toe on his left foot in the Superliga final against Mexican powerhouse Tigres and opting for surgery. Ward returned to Chicago in 2010. On August 6, 2010, Ward was traded to San Jose Earthquakes for a 2011 MLS SuperDraft pick. Ward remained with San Jose through the 2012 season appearing in 16 league matches until his contract expired on December 31, 2012.  Unfortunately, Ward has to retire early because of a torn hamstring tendon suffered in a preseason game against eventual English Premier League Champions Leicester City.

International
Ward has played for various youth United States national teams, and was part of the Under-20 team at the 2005 World Youth Championship. He had to miss the tournament due to an injury.  Ward also was a member of the Under-20 team at the 2007 World Youth Championship.

References

External links

 

1987 births
Living people
American soccer players
Saint Louis Billikens men's soccer players
New York Red Bulls players
Columbus Crew players
Colorado Rapids players
Chicago Fire FC players
San Jose Earthquakes players
Sportspeople from Waukesha, Wisconsin
Soccer players from Wisconsin
Major League Soccer players
United States men's youth international soccer players
United States men's under-20 international soccer players
United States men's under-23 international soccer players
New York Red Bulls draft picks
Association football defenders